Chialamberto is a comune (municipality) in the Metropolitan City of Turin in the Italian region Piedmont, located about  northwest of Turin.

Chialamberto borders the following municipalities: Locana, Noasca, Groscavallo, Cantoira, Ceres, and Ala di Stura.

References 

Cities and towns in Piedmont